Janey Godley (born Jane Godley Currie, January 1961) is a Scottish stand-up comedian, actress and writer from Glasgow.

Early life
Jane Godley is the youngest of four children born to Annie and Jim Currie. She was raised on Kenmore Street in Shettleston, a district in the East End of Glasgow and attended Eastbank Academy. Living in poverty, which was rife in the East End during that time, Godley left school at 16 with no qualifications. Her parents were alcoholic and her mother was also addicted to tranquilisers.

Godley and her sister, Ann Crawford, were sexually abused by their maternal uncle, David Percy. Percy, who was 12 years older than Godley, molested her and her sister for a number of years during their childhoods. Percy was charged for the crimes in 1993 after the sisters decided to come forward, and was later found guilty and sentenced to two years in prison in 1996.

Godley married Sean Storrie in 1980 at the age of 19. Storrie, who has Asperger syndrome, was born into a Glasgow gangster family. Their daughter, Ashley Storrie (born 1986), who also has autism spectrum disorder, is a stand-up comedian and BBC Radio Scotland presenter. Godley ran a public house in Calton, Glasgow with her husband and his family for 14 years during the 1980s and 1990s.

In 1982, when Godley was 21, her mother died after drowning in the River Clyde. Godley believes that her mother was murdered by her violent boyfriend. He was never charged by police for Annie Currie's death despite calls for an investigation from her family.

On 31 December 2010, her brother Mij Currie died from a drug-related illness.

Career
Godley began her stand-up career in 1994. Godley decided to use a stage name, saying to her husband: "I don't want to be Janey Storrie any more, because your family let me down, and I don't want to be Janey Currie because my family let me down. I'm going to use my middle name and legally become Janey Godley. The only family who haven't let me down are the Godleys because I don't know them." She legally changed her name from Janey Godley Storrie to Janey Godley in 1995.

She won an award for the "Best Show Concept" at the New Zealand International Comedy Festival in 2002, and the "Spirit of the Festival" in 2006. In 2005 her autobiography Handstands in the Dark was published. In 2006, she was a finalist for the Edinburgh Evening Times' "Scotswoman of the Year" award. In 2002, 2006, 2008 and 2009, she was nominated as "Best International Guest" by the New Zealand Comedy Guild.

Her TV appearances include River City, Sam Delaney's News Thing, The Alex Salmond Show, Have I Got News for You and Traces. She appears in the film Wild Rose.

Godley often makes spoof voice-overs of videos. In 2020, Godley wrote and starred in a series of short films titled Alone, about a recently widowed housewife whose abusive husband has died of COVID-19, as part of the National Theatre of Scotland's Scenes for Survival webseries. In December 2020, the Royal Society of Edinburgh commended Godley's voice-overs of First Minister Nicola Sturgeon's COVID-19 briefings for helping engage the public with the warnings.

In 2020, she won the Scots Language Award's Speaker of the Year Award.

In September 2021, tweets Godley had sent in the past were publicised by The Daily Beast, leading MSP Douglas Lumsden to question the decision to cast her in a pantomime performance of Beauty and the Beast. Some of these tweets included insults based on the Chernobyl disaster and disabilities, and racial insults towards African American musicians Kelly Rowland, 50 Cent and Snoop Dogg. Godley apologised for the tweets. Additionally, she was dropped from a Public Health Scotland campaign.

In November 2021, Godley announced via Twitter the cancellation of the last weekend of her tour, explaining that she had been diagnosed with ovarian cancer and was being treated in hospital. She had a full hysterectomy in January 2022 and announced in June that she was cancer-free. On 13 December 2022, she announced that her cancer had returned and that she would need further chemotherapy.

Political activism
Godley is a supporter of Scottish independence. She describes herself as "anti-Tory". She formerly supported the Conservatives in her youth and once met Margaret Thatcher at a Scottish Conservative Party Conference in Perth.

In February 2016, Godley joined a group of comedians on a tour of the UK in support of Labour party leader Jeremy Corbyn, although she is a supporter of the Scottish National Party.

In 2016, Godley was pictured standing outside Donald Trump's Turnberry Golf resort holding a sign stating "Trump is a Cunt", which went viral. She was prevented from approaching her subject by Police Scotland. Following a protest in Glasgow which she organised in November 2016 just prior to the election of Trump as president, she received rape threats through Twitter.

Books
 

  Illustrated by Christina Connelly

References

External links
Janey Godley's official website

1961 births
Living people
People from Calton
Scottish autobiographers
Scottish stage actresses
Scottish bloggers
Scottish stand-up comedians
Scottish women comedians
Scottish women writers
Scottish women bloggers
Comedians from Glasgow
20th-century Scottish comedians
21st-century Scottish comedians
Women autobiographers
20th-century Scottish women